Res or RES may refer to:

Sciences

Computing 

Russian and Eurasian Security Network
Spanish Supercomputing Network (Red Española de Supercomputación)

Energy 

RES - The School for Renewable Energy Science
 US Renewable Electricity Standard
Renewable Energy Systems, a UK company

Mathematics 

 Residue (complex analysis) function

Medicine 

 Reticuloendothelial system, in anatomy

Archaeology 
 Répertoire d'Épigraphie Sémitique, a journal publishing Semitic language inscriptions

Latin word meaning "thing" 

Entity (disambiguation)
Object (philosophy)
The first word of several Latin phrases:
Res divina (service of the gods)
Res extensa Descartes' physical world
Res gestae (Things done)
Res inter alios acta (A thing done between others)
Res ipsa loquitur (The thing speaks for itself)
Res judicata (A matter [already] judged)
Res nullius (An unowned thing)
Res publica (A public thing), the origin of the word republic

Organizations
Rail Express Systems
Railway Enthusiasts Society, New Zealand
Royal Economic Society, UK
Royal Entomological Society

Places
 Resistencia International Airport (IATA airport code: RES)

People
 Res (singer), American singer

Arts, entertainment, and media

Literature
 RES (magazine), bimonthly

Music

Songs
 "R.E.S.", a song by Cardiacs from The Seaside
 "The Res", a song by the American band Bright from their self-titled album

See also 
 RE5 (disambiguation)
 Rez (disambiguation)